Puerto Rico is an unincorporated territory of the United States located in the northeast Caribbean Sea, approximately  southeast of Miami, Florida. The territory has experienced the effects of  Atlantic hurricanes, or storms that were once tropical or subtropical cyclones.

List of storms

Pre-Columbian hurricanes

1500s 

 August 12–14, 1508 - An unnamed tropical cyclone affected southern Hispaniola and may have affected southern Puerto Rico.
 August 16, 1508- Hurricane San Roque is considered to be the first recorded recorded hurricane to affect Puerto Rico. Reported by Juan Ponce de León, his caravel left Santo Domingo, but another storm after the preceding storm beached it on the southwest coast of Puerto Rico at Guayanilla. It mainly affected the southwest coast of the island.
 1514 - An unknown tropical cyclone affected Puerto Rico and was reported months afterwards.
 October 4–5, 1526 - Hurricane San Francisco made landfall and progressed westward or west-northwestward and therefore also might have affected the northern group of the Leeward Islands and the Virgin Islands. A violent hurricane moved slowly over northern Puerto Rico on 4 and 5 October. The storm started at night, lasted 24 hours, and ruined the major part of the City of San Juan, Puerto Rico, including the church, and caused much damage to haciendas, agriculture, and wide spread flooding.  One source describes the storm in both 1526 and 1527.
 July 26–28, 1530 - Hurricane Santa Ana made landfall on Puerto Rico and was the first of three tropical cyclones to affect the island that year. It affected the entire island and destroyed half of the houses in San Juan, Puerto Rico. Island only had population of 3,100 at the time.
 August 22, 1530- Hurricane San Hipólito affected Puerto Rico as a weak hurricane or tropical storm bringing heavy rain.
 August 31, 1530- Hurricane San Ramon affected Puerto Rico as a violent hurricane that struck Puerto Rico nine days later after the San Hipólito hurricane. Floods isolated communities and drowned an uncounted number of persons to death.  The hurricane greatly damaged livestock and agriculture and so distressed the Spanish colonists that they considered abandoning Puerto Rico altogether.  The barrage of hurricanes during 1530 brought a condition of great suffering and poverty on Puerto Rico, which persisted for several years.
 July or August, 1537- A tropical cyclone affected Puerto Rico causing the destruction of river banks and plantations, as well as growing many cattle and slaves. The storm caused Puerto Ricans in great hardship and increased the desire of its citizens to migrate. This event may continue as the succeeding event.
 September 7, 1545- Unnamed hurricane heavily affected Hispaniola and is presumed to have affected Puerto Rico.
 August 24-24, 1568- Hurricane San Bartolomé was a severe hurricane that made landfall in Puerto Rico and caused widespread damage in San Juan, Puerto Rico and in Santo Domingo. First hurricane to be named with "Saint of the Day" affecting Puerto Rico (previous ones back to 1508 were labeled by historians).
 September 12, 1575- San Mateo hurricane was a severe hurricane that affected Puerto Rico as a tropical storm struck the island on double of Saint Matthew. Last recorded tropical storm to impact Puerto Rico during sixteenth century.

1600s

 September 12, 1615- Hurricane San Leoncio made landfall and was the first hurricane to affect the island in the seventeenth century. Caused extensive damage to Cathedral of San Juan Bautista, to the agriculture, and to sugar crops.
 September 15, 1626- San Nicomedes hurricane affected Puerto Rico as a tropical storm and sank three ships in the bay of San Juan. Cayetano Coll y Toste writes of this storm, which occurred the year after Battle of San Juan (1625), which ruined large portions of the city. The storm destroyed plantations and limited the supply of cassava bread.

1700s 

 1738 - Hurricane Santa Rosa was a hurricane caused damage to agriculture and many homes in Puerto Rico. It is estimated that it entered Puerto Rico in the east and crossed over the entire island, then passed on to the Dominican Republic.
 June 13, 1780 - Hurricane San Antonio "caused deaths and losses" on Puerto Rico, after having also struck St. Lucia, where it killed around 4,000 to 5,000 people. It is also known as the St. Lucia Hurricane. It later went on to the Dominican Republic.
 1780 - "Great Hurricane," also known as the San Calixto hurricane, was a tropical cyclone that killed an estimated 20,000-22,000 people and had winds of 200 mph. The hurricane passed close to Puerto Rico, steadily paralleling the southern coastline of the island.  It subsequently turned to the northwest, going through the Mona Passage before making landfall near the present-day Dominican Republic province of Samaná.

1800s

1900s 

 1916 - San Hipólito hurricane
 1926 - Nassau hurricane

 September 13, 1928 - Okeechobee hurricane, also known as the San Felipe II hurricane, was a major hurricane that made landfall near Guayama as a Category 5 hurricane, the strongest on record to strike the island. On September 13, the  eye crossed Puerto Rico in eight hours from the southeast to the northwest, moving ashore near Guayama and exiting between Aguadilla and Isabela. On this basis, the hurricane is believed to have made landfall in Puerto Rico as a Category 5 hurricane on the Saffir-Simpson scale, although there was uncertainty in the peak intensity, due to the large size and slow movement of the storm.
 1931 - San Nicolás hurricane
 1932 - San Ciprian hurricane
 1956 - Hurricane Betsy
 1970 - Caribbean–Azores hurricane struck Puerto Rico as a tropical depression, it was the wettest tropical cyclone on record to affect Puerto Rico. The depression left 10,000 people homeless across Puerto Rico, with 3,000 housed in emergency shelters in San Juan.  At least 600 houses were destroyed and another 1,000 damaged. Damage was particularly severe in Barceloneta, Aibonito, and Coamo. Across the island, the depression affected at least 40 state roads, with fifteen blocked by landslides, and eleven bridges destroyed. Flooding forced the closure of Puerto Rico Highway 2 between Manatí and Barceloneta. The depression left more than $40 million (1970 USD$,   USD) in crop damage, primarily to sugarcane and coffee, as reported by William R. Poage, the chair of the House Agricultural Committee. Throughout Puerto Rico, the depression caused damage estimated at $65 million (1970 USD$,   USD), as well as at least 18 confirmed fatalities. A report six months after the depression indicated there were 34 people missing, although their status is unknown.
 1989 – Hurricane Hugo

1990s 

 1990 – Tropical Storm Arthur
 1990 – Hurricane Klaus
 1991 – 1991 Perfect Storm
 1993 – Tropical Storm Cindy
 1994 – Tropical Storm Debby
 1995 – Hurricane Felix
 1995 – Hurricane Luis
 1995 – Hurricane Marilyn
 1995 – Tropical Storm Sebastien
 1996 – Hurricane Bertha
 1996 – Hurricane Hortense
 1997 – Hurricane Erika
 1997 – Tropical Storm Grace
 1998 – Hurricane Danielle
 1998 – Hurricane Georges
 1999 – Tropical Storm Jose
 1999 – Hurricane Lenny

2000s 

2000 – Hurricane Debby
2000 – Tropical Storm Helene
2001 – Tropical Storm Dean
2003 – Tropical Depression Nine
2003 – Tropical Storm Mindy
A total of $20,000 (2003 USD) in damage was reported from three bridge collapses, and a landslide occurred in Humacao.

Another greater than 100-year rain event occurred on the island of Vieques, with  falling in a 24-hour timeframe. About 50% of people in the territory were without running water by three days after the storm, and 70% were without electricity. A total of eight people (four directly killed by the storm and four indirectly) were reported dead in Puerto Rico as a result of Jeanne, and damages from the storm were estimated at $169.5 million (2004 USD).
The Fajardo River overflowed its banks, causing a highway to close in the northeast coast of the territory.
August 18, 2007 – Hurricane Dean brings rain and heavy surf to Puerto Rico, closing down several roads while passing to the south of the territory. $15,000 in damage was estimated as a result of the storm.
December 10–12, 2007 – Tropical Storm Olga as a subtropical storm made  landfall in north-central Puerto Rico, producing light to moderate rains in the territory. A river gage sensor reported the Río Grande de Arecibo at several feet above flood stage. Due to the storm, 79,000 people lost power, and 144,000 people lost access to water; as well, a landslide buried an SUV and killed one person.
Many rivers flooded their banks and many landslides were reported as a result of Hanna.

Patillas also recorded a 500-year flood event, receiving  of rain in 24 hours from 8am on September 21 to 8am on September 22. Flash floods and mudslides killed 3 people, while 3 others died indirectly due to heart attacks. Damages in Puerto Rico were recorded at $48 million (2008 USD), with $25 million of that being structural and $23 million being agricultural.
October 13–16, 2008 – Hurricane Omar brings moderate to heavy rainfall along with gusty winds that caused flash flooding, though no damage was reported. One person died after suffering a heart attack while installing storm shutters on their house.
Three schools were evacuated and roughly 6,000 people lost power as a result of the storm.
 September 3–5, 2009 – Tropical Depression Erika and its remnants brought heavy rains to parts of Puerto Rico, causing flooding. A total of $35 thousand (2009 USD) in damage was estimated as a result of the storm.

2010s 
 July 18, 2010 – The precursor to Tropical Storm Bonnie causes flooding across Puerto Rico, leading to one person drowning in a swollen river.
August 29–September 4, 2010 – Hurricane Earl passes north of Puerto Rico as a Category 4 hurricane, producing heavy rains in parts of the island. Nearly 187,000 people were left without power due to Earl, and 60,000 more were left without water in the territory.
September 17, 2010 – One person drowns as a result of rough surf produced by Hurricane Igor.
The municipality of Utuado was isolated outside of the PR-10 highway as a result of the storm. More than 40 roads were closed as a result of the storm, and 295 roads were affected in some way from the storm. In total, $6.5 million (2010 USD) was estimated in damage to the road system. An additional $1.5 million was estimated to agriculture in Ponce. At least 134 people had to take refuge from the storm, while an estimated 45,000 people lost access to drinking water. The government of Puerto Rico declared a state of emergency for the entire island during the storm.
August 1–4, 2011 – Tropical Storm Emily brings tropical storm conditions to many parts of the territory.

August 21–24, 2011 – Hurricane Irene makes landfall in Puerto Rico as a tropical storm, before strengthening to a hurricane over the main island. Over 1 million people lost power as a result of Irene, while 121,000 people lost access to water. At least 1,446 people had to either be placed in shelter or be evacuated due to the storm. One person died after their car was swept away, and a preliminary estimate indicated $500 million (2011 USD) of damage in Puerto Rico. A state of emergency for the territory was declared by president Barack Obama.
September 11–14, 2011 – Tropical Storm Maria causes $1.3 million (2011 USD) in damage while passing northeast of Puerto Rico. About a month after the storm, president Barack Obama announced that federal disaster aid would be available to the territory.
August 4, 2012 - Tropical Storm Ernesto drops locally heavy rain in areas, despite passing well south of the territory.  of rain was recorded in Jayuya, the most recorded in connection to the storm. Mudslides and flooded roads stranded at least 3 cars.
August 23–24, 2012 – Tropical Storm Isaac passes south of Puerto Rico, causing about $3,000 (2012 USD) in damage. A 75-year-old woman fell from a second-floor balcony and died while preparing for the storm.
Multiple power lines fell down across the territory and a landslide closed 2 lanes of PR-948.
September 4–5, 2013 – Tropical Depression Gabrielle produces  of rain in Puerto Rico.
The rain helped with drought conditions in parts of the territory. Prolific lightning from Bertha caused the majority of the 29,000 power outages recorded in the wake of the storm.
Several other areas in Puerto Rico, mostly near Ponce, received at least  of rain. Multiple landslides happened as a result of the rains, 17,000 people lost power, and 7,000 people lost access to clean drinking water. The monetary damage produced by the storm is unknown.
October 14–15, 2014 – Hurricane Gonzalo causes power outages in Puerto Rico, but no major damage. 20 people were forced to stay in an emergency shelter.
August 25, 2015 – The remnants of Hurricane Danny bring minor rainfall to Puerto Rico. The rains helped alleviate a drought in the territory, raising dam levels that were critically low.
Approximately 250,000 people were left without electricity, 36 homes sustained roof damage, and $17.37 million (2015 USD) in damage was caused to agriculture in the territory.

September 5–7, 2017 – Hurricane Irma passes north of Puerto Rico as a Category 5 hurricane, producing tropical storm force winds across much of the main island. The only telecommunications tower on Culebra was damaged, cutting off communications completely for several hours. At least 30 houses were destroyed there, and an additional 30 were damaged. Across the territory, at least 362,000 people lost access to water services, and approximately 1.1 million of the Puerto Rico Electric Power Authority's 1.5 million customers lost power. In all, $1 billion (2017 USD) in damage was brought by the storm, and the NHC attributed three fatalities to Irma in Puerto Rico, though four deaths were related to the storm 
September 19–21, 2017 – Hurricane Maria makes landfall on Puerto Rico as a high end Category 4 hurricane, causing catastrophic damage to the territory. The entire power grid on the island was destroyed by the storm, and 95% of cell networks on the island were down. Five days after the hurricane, 95% of the island still had no power, 95% of the island had no cell service and 44% had no tap water. By three months after the hurricane, 45% of power customers had yet to get power back, and 14% still had no tap water, though 90% of the island did have cell service by this point. Maria ultimately caused an estimated 2,975 deaths on the island, becoming the deadliest hurricane to hit Puerto Rico since the 1899 San Ciriaco hurricane. Governor of Puerto Rico Ricardo Rosselló estimated damages from the storm at $90 billion (2017 USD).
July 9–10, 2018 – The remnants of Hurricane Beryl pass south of Puerto Rico, bringing heavy rain, especially to the east side of the main island; some areas on the east side of the island received over 8 inches of rain. More than 47,000 people lost power as a result of the storm, but no deaths or injuries were reported.
August 28–29, 2019 – Hurricane Dorian passes east of Puerto Rico, causing gusty winds and heavy rain. One person died while preparing for the storm.
September 23–25, 2019 – Tropical Storm Karen closely parallels the east coast of Puerto Rico, causing flooding and displacing 217 people. No major damage occurred as a result of the storm.

2020s 
July 29–30, 2020 – Tropical Storm Isaias passes south of Puerto Rico, bringing flooding to the territory. One person died as a result, and US$59.5 million in damage is estimated from the storm.
 August 22–23, 2020 – Tropical Storm Laura passes just south of Puerto Rico, causing 200,000 people to lose power and 14,000 people to lose access to running water.  of rain fell in 
 September 18, 2020 – Hurricane Teddy causes swells on the Puerto Rico coast, killing 2 people.
September 17–19, 2022 – Hurricane Fiona made landfall in Lajas, Puerto Rico as a slow-moving Category 1 hurricane that brought heavy rains over the whole island.
November 4–6, 2022 – Hurricane Nicole reached the island as a tropical disturbance 4–8 inches (100–200 mm) torrential rainfall occurred no fatalities.

References

Bibliography 

Puerto Rico
Hurricanes